Keron Grant (born August 23, 1976, in Montego Bay) is a Jamaican-American comic book artist, who has worked mostly for Marvel Comics.

His first published work was a pinup in the back of one of the final issues of Dale Keown's Pitt.  His first steady comics work was drawing three issues of the unpublished Century comic from Rob Liefeld's Awesome Comics.  His job drawing online comics for the Matrix series led to a short stint on Iron Man when Matrix comics inker Rob Stull brought Grant to the attention of Marvel editors.

Selected works
Action Comics #790
Fantastic Four #57-59 (also cover on #58)
Gazillion one-shot
Iron Man #36 (cover pencils only) & 40–47, 48 (cover only)
Kaboom vol. 2 #1-3
Legion of Super Heroes #116
Marvel Mangaverse Fantastic Four #1
New Mutants vol. 2 #1-4
New X-Men #134
Son of Vulcan #1-6
Spider-Man/Doctor Octopus: Out of Reach #1-4
Weapon X #6
X-Men Unlimited #39, 42
Young Justice 80-page giant-sized issue

References

External links
 

American comics artists
American people of Jamaican descent
1976 births
Living people